Gilbert Ramez Chagoury (born 1946) is a Nigerian billionaire businessman, diplomat and philanthropist, who lives in Paris, France. He has been implicated in election fraud and election interference in the United States for contributing money to Congressional re-election campaigns despite American laws that prohibit foreign nationals from contributing to U.S. elections.

Early life
Gilbert Chagoury is a Lebanese Nigerian who was born to Lebanese immigrant parents in Lagos, Nigeria. He studied at the Collège des Frères Chrétiens in Lebanon before returning to Nigeria.

Business
In 1971, he co-founded the Chagoury Group with his younger brother Ronald Chagoury, an industrial conglomerate with interests in construction, real estate and property development, flour mills, water bottling and purification, glass manufacturing, insurance, hotels, furniture manufacturing, telecommunications, IT, catering and international financing. Gilbert and Ronald Chagoury founded C & C Construction in the late 1970s, which was the forerunner of Hitech and ITB (these now form the Construction Division of the Chagoury group of Companies).

Through their ownership of the Chagoury Group, Gilbert Chagoury and his family have an estimated wealth of $4.2 billion.

Diplomacy and politics
He served as an Ambassador and Adviser to governments in Africa and the Americas. He has also served as Ambassador to the Vatican for St. Lucia, economic adviser to President Mathieu Kérékou of Benin, and ambassador to UNESCO.

Chagoury was a close associate of Nigerian dictator, General Sani Abacha, who helped his business interests in the country. After Abacha died in 1998, Chagoury returned an estimated $300 million to the Nigerian government to secure his indemnity from possible criminal charges.

Chagoury has been a supporter of Bill and Hillary Clinton since the 1990s. He has funded their election campaigns and is a major donor to the Clinton Foundation.

In 2010, the U.S. Department of Homeland Security apologized to Chagoury after detaining him at Teterboro Airport for over four hours because of inclusion on a no-fly list.

In 2018, the Lebanese-Nigerian billionaire and two of his associates agreed to resolve a federal investigation that they conspired to violate federal election laws by scheming to make illegal campaign contributions to U.S. presidential and congressional candidates, including Nebraska representative Jeff Fortenberry. Fortenberry was eventually convicted of lying to federal officials about these contributions and announced his resignation effective March 31, 2022.

Philanthropy

He is a key benefactor for St. Jude Children's Research Hospital in Memphis, Tennessee, and his private contributions have improved health care and public infrastructure of Miziara, Northern Lebanon, home to both his and his wife's family. He serves on the board of the Lebanese American University where he provided a donation of $10 million to fund the Gilbert and Rose-Marie Chagoury School of Medicine and $3.5 million for the construction of the Alice Ramez Chagoury School of Nursing.

The Louvre's Gilbert et Rose Marie Chagoury Gallery is named for them, housing a permanent exhibit including French works donated by the Chagourys. He has donated in excess of $340,000 for the renovations of the Church of Our Lady of Lebanon in Paris, France. He has also donated US$10,000 to the Beverly Hills 9/11 Memorial Garden in Beverly Hills, California.

Personal life
He has been married since 1969 to Rose Marie Chamchoum. They have four children.

References

External links
Official website of Gilbert Chagoury

Living people
1946 births
Businesspeople from Lagos
Nigerian billionaires
Nigerian philanthropists
Nigerian people of Lebanese descent
20th-century Nigerian businesspeople
21st-century Nigerian businesspeople
Nigerian construction businesspeople
Nigerian hoteliers
Nigerian real estate businesspeople
Lebanese philanthropists
20th-century philanthropists
21st-century philanthropists